Jedediah Morgan Grant (February 21, 1816 – December 1, 1856) was a leader and an apostle of the Church of Jesus Christ of Latter-day Saints (LDS Church). He was member of the First Council of the Seventy from 1845 to 1854 and served in the First Presidency under church president Brigham Young from 1854 to 1856. He is known for his fiery speeches during the Reformation of 1856, earning the nickname "Brigham's Sledgehammer". Grant is the father of Heber J. Grant, who later served as President of the Church.

Early life
Jedediah M. Grant was born February 21, 1816, to Joshua Grant and Athalia Howard in Windsor, New York. He was baptized into the Church of Christ by John F. Boyington on March 21, 1833, at age 17. By age 18, he had participated in Zion's Camp, marching from Kirtland, Ohio, to Missouri under the direction of Joseph Smith. Though the physical objectives of the march were not met, many members later became leaders in Smith's church. Grant's close relationship with these men from such an early age would last the rest of his life.

Grant was among the first Latter Day Saint missionaries to go to Maryland, North Carolina, and Virginia. His preaching efforts in the Toms River area of New Jersey in the late 1830s led to the conversion of members of the Ivins family.

Grant was one of a group of men (which also included Brigham Young, Wilford Woodruff and George A. Smith) who were called in 1844 to campaign for Smith's election to President of the United States.

Church leader

After Smith's death, Grant was called to serve as a President of the Seventy. As a Seventy, he assisted with the trek westwards and the settling of the Salt Lake Valley. He would later become the first mayor of Salt Lake City, Utah, serving in that position from 1851 until his death.  Morgan County, Utah, and Morgan, Utah, are both named for him. In 1854, Grant was ordained an apostle, but he did not become a member of the Quorum of the Twelve Apostles. Instead, he was called to the First Presidency as Young's Second Counselor, filling the vacancy left by the death of Willard Richards.

Grant served in the Utah Territorial Council in 1851.

Sermons during the Mormon reformation
In 1856, Grant was called by Young to tour the northern sections of Utah Territory, calling the Latter-day Saints to repentance. Grant inspired the Mormon Reformation of 1856 as he delivered fiery speeches on this tour. He issued a call for rebaptism of all the members of the area. Grant's speeches earned him the title "Brigham's Sledgehammer." The effects of his speeches were felt almost immediately; members throughout the area, as well as in distant parts, were rebaptized to signify their commitment to renew their commitments to the LDS Church and the gospel.

Death and descendants

Grant contracted pneumonia after his vigorous tour. He died on December 1, 1856, just nine days after his son, Heber J. Grant, was born to his wife Rachel Ridgeway Ivins. He was buried at Salt Lake City Cemetery.

Like many early Mormons, Grant practiced plural marriage, a form of polygyny. He had a total of seven wives, among them Susan Fairchild Noble Grant, who wrote reminiscences of early life in Utah and was a leader in the Relief Society after Grant died. By his wives, Grant had 11 children (10 biological, one adopted). His son, Heber, became the LDS Church's seventh president.

See also
 List of mayors of Salt Lake City

Notes

References
 Sessions, Gene Allred. Mormon Thunder: A Documentary History of Jedediah Morgan Grant. University of Illinois Press, 1993.  . 
.
.

External links

Grampa Bill's G.A. Pages
A List of Sermons by Grant (Wikisource)

1816 births
1856 deaths
19th-century American politicians
American general authorities (LDS Church)
Apostles (LDS Church)
Burials at Salt Lake City Cemetery
Converts to Mormonism
Counselors in the First Presidency (LDS Church)
Deaths from pneumonia in Utah
Latter Day Saints from New York (state)
Mayors of Salt Lake City
Members of the Utah Territorial Legislature
Mormon pioneers
People from Windsor, New York
People of Utah Territory
Presidents of the Seventy (LDS Church)
Religious leaders from New York (state)